Like Wildfire is a 1917 American silent comedy drama film directed by Stuart Paton and starring Herbert Rawlinson, Neva Gerber and L.M. Wells.

Cast
 Herbert Rawlinson as Tommy Buckman
 Neva Gerber as Nina Potter
 L.M. Wells as John S. Buckman
 John Cook as Phillip Potter
 Howard Crampton as William Tobias
 Burton Law as Brown
 Willard Wayne as Phil

References

Bibliography
 Robert B. Connelly. The Silents: Silent Feature Films, 1910-36, Volume 40, Issue 2. December Press, 1998.

External links
 

1917 films
1917 drama films
1910s English-language films
American silent feature films
American black-and-white films
Universal Pictures films
Films directed by Stuart Paton
1910s American films
Silent American drama films